Serengeti Eyewear is a sunglasses line owned by Bollé Brands. Their main focus is eye protection, of which the company researches and develops technology such as photochromic lenses, polarized lenses, spectral control, among others.

History

The brand was developed by Corning. In 1984, Corning considered closing Serengeti due to poor financial performance. However, entrepreneur Zaki Mustafa convinced the board that he could save the brand. He attributed poor sales to a product-centric focus, poor marketing, anemic customer service, and inefficient asset management. With only fifty-two employees, he successfully raised sales from $5 million in 1985 to $62 million in 1992.

The Serengeti brand was acquired by Bushnell in September 2000. Bollé, Cébé and Serengeti were part of Vista Outdoor's acquisition of Bushnell in 2013. In July 2018, Vista Outdoors announced it had reached an agreement with a European private equity fund to sell the Bollé, Cébé and Serengeti eyewear brands.

Technology and design
Serengeti sunglasses include tinted photochromic and polarized lenses.

Tucker Viemeister designed aviator style sunglasses in sepia tones for Serengeti in the 1980s.

References

External links
Serengeti Eyewear
Women's Sunglasses

Sunglasses
Eyewear brands of the United States
Eyewear companies of the United States